Mengga is a town in Mangshi, Yunnan, China.

Etymology
In Dai language, "Mengga" means the most precious place.

Administrative division
As of December 2015, the town is divided into 9 villages: 
 Mengga
 Mengwen
 Mengwang
 Xiangtang
 Mangniuba
 Yangjiachang
 Sanjiaoyan
 Daxinzhai
 Tuanjing

Geography
The Xiaobailong Reservoir is a reservoir and the largest body of water in the town.

Climate

Natural history
There are 23 species of national first-class and second-class protected animals in the town.

Education
Mengga Middle School
Mengga Central Primary School

Economy
The local economy is primarily based upon agriculture and animal husbandry.

Attractions
The Sanxian Cave and Xianfo Cave are famous scenic spots in the town.

The Sanxian Temple, Guanyin Temple, Earth Mother Temple and Baoshan Temple are Buddhist temples in the town.

Transport
The County Road Mengxi Road passes across the town.

References

Divisions of Mangshi